Hypolimnas deceptor, the deceptive eggfly or deceptive diadem, is a species of Hypolimnas butterfly found in southern Africa.

Wingspan: 60–65 mm for males and 70–80 mm for females.

Flight period is year round, peaking in late summer.

Larval food is Fleurya capensis and Laportis peduncularis.

Subspecies
H. d. deceptor (southern Somalia, Kenya, Tanzania, Malawi, Mozambique, eastern Zimbabwe, South Africa: Limpopo, KwaZulu-Natal, Eastern Cape)
H. d. deludens Grose-Smith, 1891 (central and south-western Madagascar)

References

deceptor
Butterflies described in 1845